Sama’a Khraisat (born 15 August 1991) is a Jordanian footballer who currently plays as a midfielder.

International goals

External links 
 

Living people
Jordanian women's footballers
Jordan women's international footballers
Footballers at the 2010 Asian Games
Footballers at the 2014 Asian Games
1991 births
Women's association football midfielders
Asian Games competitors for Jordan
Jordanian women's futsal players